Tarleton State University is a public research university with its main campus in Stephenville, Texas. It is a founding member of the Texas A&M University System and enrolled over 14,000 students in the fall of 2020. It is classified among "R2: Doctoral Universities – High research activity".

History

John Tarleton Agricultural College was founded in 1899 with an endowment from settler John Tarleton. The college became a member of the Texas A&M University system in 1917. In 1949 it was renamed Tarleton State College then became a four-year degree-granting institution in 1959. Tarleton gained status as a university in 1973 adopting its current name, Tarleton State University. In 2003 it began offering doctoral programs.

Academics 
The university offers 68 undergraduate, 28 masters, two associate degree programs, and two doctoral programs.

Degrees are offered through seven colleges:

 Agriculture & Environmental Sciences
 Business Administration
 Education
 Graduate Studies
 Health Sciences and Human Services
 Liberal & Fine Arts
 Science & Technology

Educational programs 
The Department of Animal Sciences oversees the Tarleton Equine-Assisted Therapy (TREAT) program that is designed to utilize horseback riding as a form of physical, emotional and recreational therapy. Hippotherapy (physical therapy on horseback using the horse as a therapist) has developed as a medical field recognized by most major countries.

The Texas Institute for Applied Environmental Research (TIAER) on the Tarleton campus plays a national leadership role in environmental issues related to water quality. This program provides the university, the dairy and beef industries, environmental control agencies and governmental policy groups with water pollution data for the  Upper North Bosque River watershed.

Funded through a $1.2 million grant from the Texas Department of Transportation and a private gift from Mrs. W.K. Gordon Jr. The center is located on  near the site of Texas' first coal mine and adjacent to New York Hill along Interstate 20. The center is dedicated to the preservation, research and recording of Texas industrial history including coal mining, brick making and oil and gas exploration.

Tarleton operates two radio stations. KXTR-LP 100.7 FM is a student-operated rock station, while KTRL 90.5 FM is a public radio station broadcasting news, classical music, and jazz. Both are operated by students of Tarleton State University out of the radio station located in the Mathematics building on the TSU campus. Tarleton State University is one of four universities in the state of Texas to own and operate two radio stations; the other institutions being the University of Houston, the University of Texas at Austin, and Texas Tech University.

Campuses
Students come from around the world–32 countries and 46 states in the United States–to attend Tarleton. Most university activities take place on Tarleton's  main campus. An  operational university farm with classroom space is located near the main campus northwest of Stephenville with access from TX Highway 8 and US Route 281. The  Hunewell Ranch is located in Erath County and provides additional educational facilities. Tarleton also offers specialized programs at its Dora Lee Langdon Cultural and Educational Center in Granbury and select programs and courses at McLennan Community College in Waco, Weatherford College in Weatherford, Bryan at the RELLIS Campus, and in Fort Worth. Upper-level courses were offered at Tarleton-Central Texas in Killeen until 2009 when Texas A&M University-Central Texas was formed as a separate institution.

Stephenville
Most university activities take place on Tarleton's main campus in Stephenville, the county seat of Erath County. With a population of 21,247, Stephenville provides a combination of small-town living and proximity to Dallas–Fort Worth.

Facilities 
The main campus in Stephenville features a  sports recreation center opened in fall 2007. The two-story building holds four racquetball courts, a gym, a weight room, an indoor track, cardio equipment as well as multi-purpose rooms, classroom, and office space. The new facility is also home to a climbing wall and an "outdoor pursuit" area, allowing students the opportunity to sign up for such outdoor items as kayaks, tents, and camping equipment.

A  $13 million,  dining facility opened in fall 2008. The new building is an extension of the student center and has two floors, a convenience store, executive meeting rooms and a cafe with a wireless network.

In 2001, the university completed a $30.8 million science building complete with a 86-seat planetarium. In 2014, the Science Building was named for Dr. Lamar Johnson a former professor of biological sciences and dean of the College of Arts & Sciences.  The old science building went through an extensive $13.5 million renovation and expansion upgrading laboratories and classrooms. This building is now named the Mathematics Building. An observatory at Hunewell Ranch houses a fully robotic  research-grade telescope.

The Dick Smith Library is a three-floor facility that houses materials including print books, periodicals, curriculum collection, audio-visual material, e-books, streaming media, and special collections. The library provides over 200 computers for student use, including laptops, desktops, and collaborative spaces. There are two study rooms available for reservation, and twelve first come, first served rooms, as well as a meeting room, practice presentation room, and library training center. The library also has a Learning Commons, Tech Spot, and Study Grounds Cafe. More recently, the library has added a Maker Spot, which offers camera equipment available for checkout, a wide-format scanner, 3-D printer, 3-D scanner, and more. The Dick Smith Library participates in the TexShare program, which enables sharing of materials to and from many different libraries across the state of Texas.

Other notable buildings:

 Administration Building
 Barry B. Thompson Student Center
 Clyde H. Wells Fine Arts Center
 College of Business Administration
 E.J. Howell Education Building
 Engineering Building
 Joe W. Autry Agricultural Building
 Nursing Building
 O.A. Grant Humanities Building
 Tarleton Center
 Trogdon House
 W.K. Gordon Center for the Industrial History of Texas

Fort Worth
Tarleton–Fort Worth is a campus located in Tarrant County. The university has maintained a presence in Fort Worth since assuming control of the C.C. Terrell Memorial School of Medical Technology in the 1970s. In 2019, the university opened the first dedicated academic building on an 80–acre campus is located adjacent to the Chisholm Trail Parkway in southwest Tarrant County. The campus is projected to enroll over 9,000 students by 2030.

Leadership 
The current and 16th president is Dr. James L. Hurley who was appointed by the Texas A&M University System Board of Regents in August 2017. Dr. Karen Murray is the Chief Academic Officer serving as Provost and Executive Vice President for Academic Affairs.

As a member of the Texas A&M University System, Tarleton is one of a network of 11 higher educational institutions administered by a Chancellor and a Board of Regents. Regents are appointed by the Governor. The current Chancellor is John Sharp and chair of the Board of Regents is Elaine Mendoza.

Student life

Athletics

Tarleton State University athletics currently competes at the NCAA Division I level in the Western Athletic Conference.  They were admitted into the WAC on July 1, 2020, therefore ending their 26-year stint at the Division II level with the Lone Star Conference. Their admission into the conference in 1995 marks their second period of membership, having previously participated from 1968 to 1975.  They were a founding member of the Texas Intercollegiate Athletic Association (TIAA) in 1976 and remained in that league until 1990.  From 1991 to 1994 Tarleton played as an Independent. Tarleton left the LSC and Division II in July 2020 to join the Division I Western Athletic Conference.

The teams are known as the "Texans".  Athletes were known as the "Plowboys" before the college became a four-year institution in 1961.

When women's sports were introduced in 1968–69, those teams played under the "Texans" nickname, but due to the desire of that day's female athletes to play under a distinctive nickname, the women's nickname was changed the next school year. "Texanns", "Tex-Anns", and "TexAnns" were used interchangeably until 1972–73, when "TexAnns" was officially settled on. Following a campaign initially led by two players and a (female) student manager in the women's basketball program, Tarleton returned the "Texans" nickname to women's teams in 2019–20.

The basketball and volleyball teams play at Wisdom Gym. The football team plays at Memorial Stadium. The baseball team plays at Cecil Ballow Baseball Complex.  The softball team plays at the Tarleton Softball Complex.

Tarleton State University fields six men's varsity sports and eight women's varsity sports in the Lone Star Conference:

Music

The music program at Tarleton State University is fully accredited member of the National Association of Schools of the Music (NASM). It is housed in the elegant Clyde H. Wells Fine Arts Center, one of the top performance venues among colleges and universities in the Southwest. This multi-purpose fine arts complex contains three theatres: a 243-seat recital hall, an 805-seat auditorium, and the workshop theatre. There is a 16 keyboard piano lab and computer lab. The instrument collection includes two nine-foot concert Steinway grand pianos, the Waggener Memorial Organ – a tracker two-manual pipe organ, a Richard Kingston harpsichord, and several Steinway grand pianos that are designated for piano majors to practice. The Music department at Tarleton State University currently offers three degrees, which are Bachelor of Arts in Music, Bachelor of Music in Music Education (with all-level certification) and the Bachelor of Music in Performance. It currently offers one online graduate degree, Master of Music in Music Education. The program has over 150 full-time enrolled students with 80% of the majority being instrumental studies and 20% being vocal studies. The Tarleton music department hosts many festivals and clinics throughout the school year, including Brass Day, TMEA All-Region Band clinics, Jazz Festival, Invitational Band Festival, TMEA Area Choir clinics, and the Let All Men Sing!

The Tarleton Band program offers many ensembles, which are open to both music majors and non-music majors:

The Sound and the Fury, The Texan Marching Band,
Foul Play Basketball Band,
Chamber Winds (audition required),
Wind Ensemble (audition required),
Symphonic Band,
Jazz Band 1 & 2 (audition required),
Brass Ensemble,
Woodwind Chamber Ensemble,
Trumpet Ensemble, Horn Choir,
and Flute Choir.

Texan Corps of Cadets
The Texan Corps of Cadets was founded in 1917 when John Tarleton Agriculture College joined the Texas A&M University system. The Corps of Cadets was initially known as "Johns Army". The Corps of Cadets survived through the end of the 1950s. Until 2016 the school had only an Army ROTC program. However, in 2016 the Texan Corps of Cadets was brought back to the university.

The Texan Corps of Cadets offers students an opportunity to obtain a minor in Leadership Studies. All cadets live together in a residence hall at Tarleton called Traditions. All cadets wear their uniforms to class every day and must abide by the regulations set forth in the "Chisel".

Traditions

Oscar P.
Oscar P. was, according to legend, John Tarleton's pet duck who went everywhere with him. The two were so close that the duck is supposedly buried with Tarleton.  During athletic events, students chant to raise the spirit of Oscar P.

Purple Poo
TTP – Ten Tarleton Peppers (1921) and TTS – Ten Tarleton Sisters (1923) are the two oldest spirit organizations on campus and are precursors of the Purple Poo, a secret organization which promotes school spirit. The members in this organization keep their identities secret by appearing in public in costume. The organization gathers to make "Poo Say" signs each Monday night. The "Poo Say" signs appear nailed to trees on campus every Tuesday morning and occasionally comment on campus political life and student life.

The Plowboys
The Plowboys, originally the mascot for Tarleton athletic teams, but more recently known as a spirit organization, wear purple and white shirts, cowboy hats, and purple chaps. Founded in 1984, they organize the Bonfire every year.

Texan Rider
Texan Rider is Tarleton's current mascot that at one time rode a horse during the football games (this tradition was discontinued due to the renovated stadium), and wears purple chaps. The Texan Rider has been the mascot of Tarleton since 1961 when the student body chose the Texans and TexAnns to represent its athletic teams.

Silver Taps
Silver Taps, a ceremony held to honor Tarleton's faculty, staff, students, and alumni who have died over the past year, is held in the spring during Founder's Week.

Homecoming
During the 1980s, the Student Government Association added the Yell Contest to Homecoming Week. Student organizations perform step and dance moves to original chants and lyrics; a panel of judges selects the top two teams. The winning team has the honor of beating the drum immediately following the Plowboys.

Special awards

John Tarleton Spirit Award
The John Tarleton Spirit Award originated in 1988, and is given to up to 12 students annually at the Leadership and Service Awards Banquet. Recipients are chosen based on campus involvement through organizations, special projects, and activities that contribute to the overall growth of the individual.

Notable people

Alumni 
Chris Adams, retired US Air Force Major General
Ryan Bingham, singer/songwriter, Grammy Award and 2010 Academy Award winner
Ben Barnes, former Lieutenant Governor of Texas (1969–1973) and Speaker of the Texas House of Representatives (1965–1969)
Richard Bartel, NFL quarterback
 Philip Montgomery, current head football coach at the University of Tulsa
DeWayne Burns (class of 1994), Republican member of Texas House of Representatives from Johnson and Bosque counties since 2015
James Dearth, NFL tight end
William E. Dyess, survivor of Bataan Death March during World War II
Chad Fox, MLB player
J. W. Fritz, the head of the police investigation of the murder of president John F. Kennedy
Steve Fryar, professional steer wrestler
Bob Glasgow, Democratic Texas State Senator
Rick Hardcastle, Republican former member of Texas House of Representatives from Wilbarger County
Millie Hughes-Fulford, chemist and astronaut
Jim Johnson, college athletics director
Rufus Johnson, NFL linebacker selected in sixth round (pick 183) of 2013 NFL Draft
George Kennedy, actor
Chris Kyle, U.S. Navy Seal
Stacey McGill, program director, Trace Systems
Sid Miller, Texas Agriculture Commissioner and former member of Texas House of Representatives
Mike Moncrief, member of Texas House of Representatives, judge, former mayor of Fort Worth
Hal Mumme, college football coach
Derrick Ross, former NFL football player
James Earl Rudder, U.S. Army Major General and World War II veteran, former Chancellor of the Texas A&M University System
Sam M. Russell, U.S. Representative serving 1941–1947
Norman Shumway, father of heart transplantation
Charles Steen, geologist who made first big strike of 1950s uranium boom
Charles W. Stenholm, U.S. Representative from 1979 to 2005
Clyde H. Wells, Texas A&M University System Regent 1961–1985 and rancher
Randy Winkler, NFL offensive tackle
Marvin Zindler, investigative reporter for KTRK-TV
E. J. Speed, NFL linebacker
Koe Wetzel,Texas country music singer/songwriter

Faculty 

 Barry B. Thompson, former Chancellor of the Texas A&M University System

References

External links 
 
 Official Athletics Website

 
1899 establishments in Texas
Buildings and structures in Erath County, Texas
Education in Erath County, Texas
Educational institutions established in 1899
Texas A&M University System
Tourist attractions in Erath County, Texas
Universities and colleges accredited by the Southern Association of Colleges and Schools
Public universities and colleges in Texas